Jeronimo de Albuquerque (c. 1510–1584) was a nobleman, military leader, and colonial administrator in the Portuguese colony of Pernambuco, Brazil.

Scion of the Albuqueques, Jeronimo was son of Lopo de Albuquerque and Joana de Bulhão, a cousin of  Afonso de Albuquerque and Garcia de Naronha both viceroys of India, and brother to Matias de Albuquerque, viceroy of India, all descendants of King Dinis (1279-1325). He accompanied his sister Dona Brites de Albuquerque and her husband Duarte Coelho donatário (Lord Proprietor) of Pernambuco and with them settled in the New World in 1535.

Jeronimo de Albuquerque was a leading and colorful personage in the early years of the Captaincy of Pernambuco.  He led in many fights against the indigenous peoples. In an early battle he was blinded in one eye by an arrow. He was henceforth called “o torto” (the crooked). He was captured by indigenous cannibals but escaped death when the daughter of one of the principals pleaded on his behalf. He married this woman among the Tabajara peoples and she was baptized as Maria do Espirito Santo Arco Verde. They had eight children. With his marriage to this woman an alliance with the Tabajara tribe was furthered which was of great benefit to the colony. Later he married Felippa de Mello and with her had eleven children. He fathered five additional legitimized children with both indigenous and European women. It is verified that Jeronimo fathered twenty-four children who were legitimate or legitimized and there are unverified reports that his children numbered more than 100. As a result of his known and rumored fatherings, in later generations he was often called the “Adam of Pernambuco”.

Jeronimo de Albuquerque served as deputy or lieutenant governor to his sister Brites de Albuquerque when she governed, first in the absence of the donatário, Duarte Coelho, and after the first donatário’s death, during the minority of the heir Duarte Coelho de Albuquerque, second donatário of Pernambuco. He officially governed Pernambuco as capitão mor and procurador beginning March 5, 1576, and directed the government until the year 1580. (It is reported that during a portion of his official tenure the government was directed by his father-in-law Christovão da Mello, perhaps due to failing health).

Jeronimo de Albuquerque built the first sugar mill in Pernambuco, o engenho Nossa Senhora da Ajuda.  He died in December, 1584, and was buried in the chapel on his engenho Nossa Senhora da Ajuda.

References 

1510 births
1584 deaths
Year of birth uncertain